Alexis Davis may refer to:
 Alexis Davis (General Hospital)
 Alexis Davis (fighter)